Mohabbat Mushkil Hai (lit: Love is difficult) premiered on 3 July 2017 on Hum TV as a daily soap at the 7pm slot as Sangsar was moved to 7:30pm to accommodate the end of soap 'Jithani'. It originally ran on sister channel Hum Sitaray at the end of 2015, as an unfinished serial of 20 episodes titled 'Naa Dil Deti' (similar to the life of Zindagi Tujh Ko Jiya).

Plot 
Mohabbat Mushkil Hai is a story that highlights the effects of century's old custom "watta satta," on the lives of two young girls Uroosa and Aqsa. The story of 'Mohabbat Mushkil Hai' mainly revolves around Uroosa and Saqib who love each other, yet Saqib is forced by his parents to marry his cousin, so that Saqib's sister could be married to Saqib's to be brother-in-law. On the other hand, Saqib's mother trapped Uroosa into believe that there's no other way to save Saqib from trouble by protecting Saqib's sister's marriage, Uroosa decides to sacrifice her love. Will this sacrifice safe Saqib's troubled life? Will Saqib forego his right to choose his own life partner?

Cast

Main 
 Anum Fayyaz as Uroosa
 Humayun Ashraf as Saqib
 Anoushay Abbasi as Aqsa 
 Kiran Tabeir as Maham
 Imran Ashraf as Zain 
 Saba Hameed as Asma
 Shaheen Khan as Riffat
 Nasreen Qureshi

Pakistani drama television series
2017 Pakistani television series debuts
2017 Pakistani television series endings
Urdu-language television shows
Hum TV original programming